This is a list of anime by release date which covers Japanese animated productions that were made between 1939–1945.

Notable births
 June 26, 1940 - Tetsu Dezaki, director, producer, screenwriter.
 January 5, 1941 - Hayao Miyazaki, director, producer, screenwriter, animator, author, manga artist.
 November 18, 1943 - Osamu Dezaki (1943 – 2011), film director, screenwriter.
 April 21, 1944 - Toyoo Ashida (1944 – 2011), director, character designer, animator, animation director, screenwriter.

Notable deaths
February 2, 1945 - Seitarō Kitayama (b. 1888)

See also
List of anime by release date (pre-1939)
List of anime by release date (1946–1959)
History of anime
List of years in animation

References

External links
Japanese Animation Filmography Project

External links 
Japanese animated works of the period, listed in the IMDb

Release date
Anime debuts by date
Years in anime
1930s anime films
1930s in animation
1940s anime films
1940s in animation